John Dore is a basketball coach.

John Dore may also refer to:

John Clark Dore (1822–1900), American educator and politician from New Hampshire
John F. Dore (1881–1938), mayor of Seattle
Jon Dore (born 1976), Canadian comedian and actor

See also

John Doar, American lawyer
John Dory, a type of fish
John Dory (song), possibly the namesake for the fish